BYU–Pathway Worldwide (BYU–PW) is a higher education organization of the Church of Jesus Christ of Latter-day Saints (LDS Church). It was formed in 2017 and is responsible for online higher education within the Church Educational System.

History 
BYU–PW started in 2009 as PathwayConnect, a program of BYU–Idaho. PathwayConnect is a non-matriculated program that makes higher education more attainable. Since its creation, PathwayConnect enrollment has risen exponentially, from 50 original students, to approximately 7,000 students in 2013, to more than 15,000 in 2017. The students take courses online, but they also meet once a week in small groups to create 'scaffolding confidence.'

On February 7, 2017, the LDS Church announced the creation of BYU–PW to provide strategic oversight and leadership for the church's online higher education initiatives, which consists of PathwayConnect and online higher education certificate and degree programs.  As of October 2020, those programs are developed by BYU-Idaho and Ensign College. As of 2017, PathwayConnect covers one year (three semesters), during which students take at least one academic online course and one religious education course each semester. Clark Gilbert, formerly the president of BYU–Idaho, was credited with developing the program in 2009 and was the organization's first president from 2017 until 2021, when he was called as an LDS Church general authority and was succeeded by Brian K. Ashton.  

In 2019, it was announced that all LDS Church returning missionaries automatically receive pre-approval for admission to BYU–PW’s PathwayConnect program. Gilbert stated that the program is intended to be scalable and currently has no enrollment cap.

During 2019, BYU–PW served 44,482 unduplicated students (28,059 in PathwayConnect and 19,355 in BYU–Idaho online degree programs). PathwayConnect students participated in 500+ locations throughout 145 countries, and BYU–Idaho online-degree students participated in all 50 states and 87 countries.

In 2020, BYU–PW reached a new milestone by serving 51,583 students (33,238 in PathwayConnect and 23,172 in BYU–Idaho online degree programs).

References

External links
 Official website

Brigham Young University
Distance education institutions based in the United States
Online colleges
 
Educational institutions established in 2017
2017 establishments in Utah